The 2016 Kor Royal Cup was the 81st Kor Royal Cup, an annual football match contested by the winners of the previous season's Thai Premier League and Thai FA Cup competitions.  The match was played at Supachalasai Stadium, Bangkok and contested by 2015 Thai Premier League champions Buriram United, and 2015 Thai Premier League runners-up Muangthong United, as Buriram also won the 2015 Thai FA Cup. This match was the last edition of Kor Royal Cup, continued by Thailand Champions Cup in 2017.

Details

Assistant referees:
  Nathakorn Chimpalee
  Binla Preeda
Fourth official:
  Alongkron Feemuechang
Match Commissioner:
  Mr. Benjamin Tan
Referee Assessor:
  Ekachai Thanaduengkao

See also
 2016 Thai League
 2016 Thai Division 1 League
 2016 Regional League Division 2
 2016 Football Division 3
 2016 Thai FA Cup
 2016 Thai League Cup

2016 in Thai football cups
Thailand Kor Royal Cup
2016